Ystrad Mynach Hospital was a community hospital in Ystrad Mynach, Wales. It was managed by Aneurin Bevan Local Health Board.

History
The hospital was established by converting a war-time miners' hostel located on the western side of the Caerphilly Road in the early 1950s. After services transferred to the new Ysbyty Ystrad Fawr, which had been built on the eastern side of the Caerphilly Road facing the old hospital, Ystrad Mynach Hospital closed in 2011. The old hospital was subsequently demolished and the site redeveloped for use as a sports centre.

References

External links
Photographs of the closed site

Hospitals established in the 1950s
Defunct hospitals in Wales
Hospitals in Caerphilly County Borough